Styringomyia is a genus of crane fly in the family Limoniidae.

Species

S. acanthobasis Alexander, 1962
S. acuapicalis Alexander, 1972
S. acuta Edwards, 1926
S. amazonica Ribeiro, 2003
S. angustipennis Alexander, 1936
S. angustitergata Alexander, 1938
S. annulipes (Enderlein, 1912)
S. apiculata Alexander, 1971
S. armata Edwards, 1924
S. atlantica Ribeiro, 2003
S. bancrofti Edwards, 1914
S. bicornuta Alexander, 1938
S. bidens Hynes, 1987
S. bidentata Hynes, 1987
S. bipunctata Edwards, 1924
S. biroi Edwards, 1924
S. borneana Edwards, 1926
S. bourbonensis Alexander, 1953
S. bualae Hynes, 1988
S. caudifera Alexander, 1953
S. celebesensis Alexander, 1935
S. cerbereana Alexander, 1976
S. ceylonica Edwards, 1911
S. chelifera Alexander, 1975
S. claggi Alexander, 1931
S. clandestina Alexander, 1956
S. clio Alexander, 1953
S. colona Edwards, 1927
S. contorta Alexander, 1956
S. cornuta Alexander, 1956
S. crassicosta (Speiser, 1908)
S. curvispina Edwards, 1931
S. dendroides Alexander, 1930
S. denticulata Alexander, 1953
S. didyma Grimshaw, 1901
S. digistostylus Hynes, 1987
S. dilinhi Hynes, 1987
S. ebejeri Hancock, 1997
S. edwardsiana Alexander, 1930
S. ensifera Edwards, 1924
S. ensiferoides Alexander, 1948
S. flava Brunetti, 1911
S. flavitarsis Alexander, 1920
S. flavocostalis Alexander, 1925
S. formosana Edwards, 1914
S. fryeri Edwards, 1914
S. fulani Alexander, 1975
S. fumipennis Edwards, 1926
S. fumitergata Alexander, 1964
S. fumosa Edwards, 1924
S. furcata Alexander, 1956
S. furcifera Alexander, 1976
S. fuscinervis Edwards, 1925
S. geminata Alexander, 1938
S. halavana Alexander, 1951
S. himalayana Edwards, 1914
S. holomelania Alexander, 1936
S. idioformosa Hynes, 1987
S. impunctata Edwards, 1914
S. ingrami Edwards, 1924
S. jacobsoni Edwards, 1914
S. javana Edwards, 1914
S. kala Alexander, 1955
S. kalabakanensis Hynes, 1988
S. kempiana Alexander, 1942
S. kerteszi Edwards, 1924
S. kwangtungensis Alexander, 1949
S. labuanae Hynes, 1987
S. lambertoni Alexander, 1953
S. leucopeza Edwards, 1914
S. leucoplagia Alexander, 1953
S. liberiensis Alexander, 1930
S. lineaticeps Edwards, 1914
S. longituberculata Alexander, 1956
S. luteipennis Alexander, 1931
S. mahensis Edwards, 1912
S. manauara Ribeiro, 2003
S. manicata Edwards, 1928
S. marmorata Senior-White, 1924
S. marshalli Edwards, 1914
S. matileana Alexander, 1979
S. maya Ribeiro, 2003
S. mcgregori Alexander, 1925
S. medleriana Alexander, 1972
S. melanaspis Alexander, 1971
S. melania Edwards, 1925
S. melanopinax Alexander, 1948
S. mitra Alexander, 1955
S. moheliana Alexander, 1959
S. monochaeta Alexander, 1970
S. montina Alexander, 1931
S. multisetosa Alexander, 1964
S. mystica Alexander, 1945
S. neocaledoniae Alexander, 1948
S. neocolona Alexander, 1931
S. nepalensis Edwards, 1914
S. nigripalpis Edwards, 1914
S. nigrisoma Alexander, 1956
S. nigrobarbata Alexander, 1971
S. nigrofemorata Edwards, 1914
S. nigrosternata Alexander, 1931
S. nipponensis Alexander, 1929
S. nirvana Alexander, 1955
S. obscura Brunetti, 1911
S. obscuricincta Edwards, 1924
S. obuduensis Alexander, 1975
S. occidentalis Edwards, 1924
S. omeiensis Alexander, 1935
S. papuana Edwards, 1924
S. paulista Alexander, 1946
S. pendula Alexander, 1937
S. pentachaeta Alexander, 1970
S. phallosomica Alexander, 1964
S. phallosomica Alexander, 1975
S. platystyla Alexander, 1962
S. princeps Alexander, 1943
S. quadridivisa Alexander, 1972
S. recurvata Alexander, 1975
S. reducta Alexander, 1938
S. rostrostylus Hynes, 1987
S. sabroskyi Alexander, 1972
S. scalaris Alexander, 1962
S. schmidiana Alexander, 1957
S. schoutedeni Alexander, 1930
S. separata Alexander, 1935
S. serristylata Alexander, 1930
S. sessilis Alexander, 1972
S. setifera Alexander, 1964
S. siberiensis Alexander, 1935
S. simplex Alexander, 1945
S. sinensis Alexander, 1930
S. sjostedti Edwards, 1914
S. soembana Edwards, 1932
S. solocipennis (Enderlein, 1912)
S. solomonensis Alexander, 1951
S. spathulata Alexander, 1937
S. spinicaudata Alexander, 1936
S. spinistylata Alexander, 1956
S. stenophallus Alexander, 1975
S. stuckenbergi Alexander, 1958
S. subimmaculata Alexander, 1950
S. subobscura Alexander, 1966
S. susilae Alexander, 1942
S. tablasensis Alexander, 1929
S. taiwanensis Alexander, 1930
S. tarsatra Alexander, 1966
S. tenuispina Alexander, 1971
S. tenuisterna Alexander, 1960
S. tergata Alexander, 1960
S. terraereginae Alexander, 1924
S. thetis Alexander, 1949
S. transversa Edwards, 1926
S. trifurciscutata Hynes, 1988
S. trilobula Alexander, 1972
S. variegata Edwards, 1914
S. vietnamensis Hynes, 1987
S. vittata Edwards, 1914
S. vritra Alexander, 1955
S. xenophallus Alexander, 1956
S. youngi Ribeiro, 2003
S. ysabellae Hynes, 1987

References

Limoniidae